The 1968 Democratic National Convention protests were a series of protest activities against the Vietnam War that took place prior to and during the 1968 Democratic National Convention.

Counterculture and anti-Vietnam War protest groups began planning protests and demonstrations in response to the convention, and the city promised to maintain law and order. The protesters were met by the Chicago Police Department in the streets and parks of Chicago before and during the convention, including indiscriminate police violence against protesters, reporters, photographers, and bystanders that was later described by the  National Commission on the Causes and Prevention of Violence as a "police riot".

During the evening of August 28, 1968, with the police riot in full swing on Michigan Avenue in front of the Democratic party's convention headquarters, the Conrad Hilton hotel, television networks broadcast live as the anti-war protesters began the now-iconic chant "The whole world is watching".

Planning

National Mobilization Committee to End the War in Vietnam

In the fall of 1967, members of the National Mobilization Committee to End the War in Vietnam (often referred to as "MOBE"), which was directed by David Dellinger, proposed a massive anti-war demonstration to coincide with the 1968 Democratic National Convention. In early 1968, the National Mobilization Committee opened a Chicago office directed by Rennie Davis and Tom Hayden, who were leading political organizers at the time and former leaders of Students for a Democratic Society.

MOBE was an umbrella organization that included groups who were opposed to American participation in the Vietnam War. MOBE was run by a small executive board that set up a general framework for mass demonstrations, sent out invitations to the over 500 groups on its mailing lists, and coordinated activities between the groups. 

MOBE recognized and supported all tactics from marching to civil disobedience. MOBE's main aim was to get the largest turnouts at its functions. David Dellinger, MOBE chairman, believed that "The tendency to intensify militancy without organizing wide political support [was] self-defeating. But so [was] the tendency to draw way from militancy into milder and more conventional forms of protest."

For Chicago, MOBE originally planned for two large-scale marches and an end of convention rally at Soldier Field. The goal was originally a massive show of force outside the International Amphitheatre.  MOBE also planned to have workshops and movement centers distributed in 10 parks throughout the city, many in predominantly black areas, to allow demonstrators and participating groups to follow their particular focuses.

Youth International Party

The Youth International Party was one of the major groups in the organization of the protests. Abbie Hoffman, Jerry Rubin, and a few friends engaged in conversation at Hoffman's apartment on New Year's Eve, 1967. They discussed the events of the year, such as the Summer of Love and the Pentagon demonstration. The idea of having a free music festival in Chicago was suggested to defuse political tension. Over the next week, the Youth International Party took shape. Its members, known as "Yippies" politicized hippie ideology and used street theater and other tactics to critique the culture of the United States and induce change.

In preparation for the Chicago convention, the Yippies held the "Yip-In", and the "Yip-Out" at Grand Central Station in New York City. Both events were planned simply as "be-ins", with live music. The event was used to promote peace, love and harmony, and as a trial run for Chicago.  The black banner of an anarchist group was hung on the wall, bearing the words, "Up Against the Wall Mother Fucker" in red. Police stood by watching the crowds. As the "Yip-In" progressed, relations between the police and Yippies became strained. Two people climbed a large clock and removed the hands; the police responded by clearing the station. They formed a skirmish line, ordered the people to disperse, and then started forcing their way through the crowd.

The "Yip-Out" was similar in purpose but held in Central Park. To obtain the permits and aid from New York City officials necessary for the event, Yippies performed a sit-in at the mayor's office until the Mayor would negotiate on permits. In the end, an agreement was made on staging, electricity, police presence, bathrooms, and other necessities for running a music festival.  Police milled in the crowd giving considerable leeway to the proceedings which led to a peaceable day.

The Yippies took a radical approach to the Democratic National Convention. They wrote articles, published fliers, made speeches and held rallies and demonstrations, to announce that they were coming to Chicago. Threats were made that nails would be thrown from overpasses to block roads; cars would be used to block intersections, main streets, police stations and National Guard armories; LSD would be dumped in the city's water supply and the convention would be stormed. However, none of these threats came to fruition. Nonetheless, city officials in Chicago prepared for all possible threats. A vilification campaign led by Chicago authorities worked in favor of the Yippies' plan.

One of the Yippies' main tactics was to use street theatre to create an experience that drew the attention of mainstream America. Yippie activities were used to put across the message that the average American didn't have control over the political process. They tried to show this by purposefully participating in non-traditional activities that would not conceivably affect the decision-making process in the convention hall, unlike a "straight" protest with picket lines, marches, and rallies which could conceivably convince delegates of mass support for a program. On a Wednesday night, networks moved their coverage away from the Amphitheater where the delegates were voting on the nomination, to a "pitched battle" in front of the Conrad Hilton hotel.

Prelude

Official responses
In the buildup to the Convention, Chicago mayor Richard J. Daley repeatedly announced "Law and order will be maintained".

Chicago's security forces prepared for the protests during the convention.  Besides the standard gun and billy club, Chicago Police Department officers had mace and riot helmets. For the convention, the CPD borrowed a new portable communications system from the military, thus increasing communication between field officers and command posts.  All summer long, police officers had received refresher training on crowd control and riot techniques.  During the convention itself, Police Academy instructors were with the reserve forces, giving last-minute reminders.

 Mayor Daley, citing intelligence reports of potential violence, put the 12,000 members of the Chicago Police Department on twelve-hour shifts, while the U.S. Army placed 6,000 troops in position to protect the city during the convention and nearly 6,000 members of the National Guard were sent to the city, with an additional 5,000 National Guard on alert, bolstered by up to 1,000  FBI and military intelligence officers, and 1,000 Secret Service agents.

To satisfy manpower requirements, the City put the force on 12-hour shifts, instead of the normal 8-hour shifts. This gave police commanders approximately 50% more field officers to deal with disturbances.  Two-thirds of the officers would continue with the normal police duties with the remaining third available for special assignment. In the Amphitheatre, the City concentrated 500 officers filling various roles.  In Lincoln Park, the number of officers patrolling during the daytime was doubled, but the majority of the officers assigned to the Lincoln Park area were held in reserve, ready to respond to any disturbance. 

In suspected trouble areas, police patrols were heavy.  Further away from the center patrols were less frequent.  This allowed the police to shift easily and quickly to control a problem without leaving an area unguarded.  While maintaining a public image of total enforcement of all city, state, and federal laws, the Narcotics division was quietly reassigned to regular fieldwork, curtailing anti-drug operations during the DNC.

Police officials and Mayor Daley had worked with the National Guard to create a plan to effectively use the Guard.  It would be called up at the beginning of the convention, but held in reserve at strategically placed armories or collection points such as Soldier Field. With the Guard in place at their armories, the CPD could request and receive assistance quickly.

Permits

Both MOBE and Yippie needed permits from the city in order to hold their respective events. The City had several reasons for denying permits to MOBE and Yippie and thus stalled issuing permits.  The City was worried about a black rebellion, independent of the white protesters, during the convention.  To avoid trouble, the City used its influence with black community organizations such as The Woodlawn Organization, the Black Consortium, and Operation Breadbasket to try to keep their constituents calm and peaceful.  Some of the militant black leaders were encouraged to leave town during the convention to avoid being implicated in any violence. 

The City also believed that having large numbers of white protesters marching through the black ghettos with a heavy police or National Guard escort would inflame the ghettos and set off rioting.  Therefore, the City categorically denied any permit that included parks in or march routes through black areas. 

Another argument the City used to deny permits was that the permits asked the City to set aside local and state ordinances.  A city ordinance closed the city parks at 11 pm, although this was not strictly enforced. In a letter to Yippie, Deputy Mayor David Stahl gave eight rules for Yippie to follow, including submitting detailed plans and requirements, following all city, state, and federal ordinances, and toning down the rhetoric. The Yippies refused, so the City felt justified in denying Yippie their permits. 

In a last-ditch effort, MOBE filed a lawsuit in federal court seeking it to force Chicago to issue permits for a rally in Soldier Field or Grant Park.  Judge Lynch, Daley's former law partner, heard the case, and summarily dismissed the request, citing that the city could deny permits on the basis of protecting "public comfort, convenience, and welfare".

Protests

August 22: Shooting of Dean Johnson
The start of the convention week's violence is sometimes traced to the shooting of Dean Johnson by Chicago police officers. Dean Johnson, age 17, and another boy were stopped on the sidewalk by the officers for a curfew violation early on the morning of Thursday, August 22. When Johnson drew and fired a pistol at police (the gun misfired), police officers returned fire, hitting Johnson three times. The Yippies and SDS hastily organized a memorial service for Johnson, but as one observer noted, due to poor planning "it turned out that no one had made any plans to actually do anything. We just milled around and began to fill up the intersection. Two squad cars pulled up and the cops got out and told us to keep moving ... but they were pretty gentle about it".

August 23: Planned protests
On Friday, August 23, Jerry Rubin and other Yippies attempted to formally nominate the Yippie candidate for president, Pigasus, a pig. By the time Rubin arrived with Pigasus, several hundred spectators and reporters had gathered on the Civic Center plaza. Police officers were waiting, and after the pig was released, Rubin, folk singer Phil Ochs, and five other Yippies were arrested.

August 24: Marches

At 6 a.m. on Saturday, August 24, continuous surveillance began in Lincoln Park. For the previous several nights, the police had cleared Lincoln Park at 11 p.m. and maintained a significant presence during the day. Women Strike for Peace attempted to hold a women-only picket at the Hilton Hotel, the main delegate hotel. Despite plans for buses from around the country to bring hundreds of picketers, only 60 or so women showed up. 

It was generally agreed upon to not attempt to stay in Lincoln Park after the curfew, but to rather take the protest to the streets. At exactly 11 p.m., poet Allen Ginsberg led protesters out of the park into the streets. SDS leaders organized several hundred protesters to march through the streets chanting things such as 'Peace Now' while the police simply guarded Lincoln Park. When the crowd stopped at Wells and North Avenue, blocking the intersection, a police contingent arrived and cleared the crowd. Eleven people were arrested and several police cars were stoned before the crowd dispersed into the normal Saturday nightlife.

August 25: Protests and music

On Sunday, MOBE had scheduled a 'Meet the Delegates' march and picket. At 2 p.m. there were between 200 and 300 picketers marching across the street from the Conrad Hilton, and another 500 marching south through the Loop chanting, "Hey, Hey LBJ, how many kids did you kill today". After the police arrival, those who were picketing moved into nearby Grant Park to avoid a mass arrest situation. Once the marchers had reached Grant Park, there was a brief rally where Davis and Hayden claimed the day a success, and then went to Lincoln Park where the Festival of Life music festival was beginning. 

At 4 pm, the Festival started with proto-punk band MC5, the only band who showed up for the festival. The police did not allow a flatbed truck to be brought in as a stage, fearing Yippies would use it to incite the crowd. When the concession stand owner insisted that Yippie stop using his electrical outlets to run the amplification equipment, confusion ensued. While Rubin and other Yippies tried to make frantic deals to get the sound back on, Hoffman used the confusion to try to bring in the flatbed truck. A deal was struck allowing the truck to be parked nearby, but not in, the park. The crowd that had gathered around and on the truck did not realize an agreement had been reached and thought the truck was being sent away. The crowd surged around the truck, pinning in the police officers. 

Hoffman declared that the police had stopped the music festival, and proceeded to conduct a workshop on dispersal tactics to avoid arrest by police. As the next police shift came on duty, they were informed of the tense situation in the park. Due to the number, frequency, diverseness, and exposure of the threats made by the protesters, the police were concerned about facing protesters armed with unknown weapons and unknown intentions. 

At 9 pm, police formed a skirmish line around the park bathrooms. This drew a crowd of spectators who heckled the police. The crowd rapidly grew until the police charged into the crowd swinging their batons, scattering the crowd. At 11 pm the police pushed the protesters out of the park. Most protesters left the park and congregated nearby, taunting the police. 

Initially when the police reached the edge of the park, they maintained their skirmish line, however when a squad was ordered to 'clear' Clark Street to keep traffic flowing the police lost control. A running battle began. Yippie Jerry Rubin told a friend "This is fantastic and it's only Sunday night. They might declare martial law in this town." Protesters, journalists, photographers, and bystanders were clubbed and beaten by the police.  Order was not restored in Old Town until early Monday morning.

August 26: Grant Park

On Monday, August 26, demonstrators climbed on a statue of General Logan on a horse, leading to violent skirmishes with police in Grant Park. Police hauled a young man down and arrested him, breaking his arm in the process.

August 28: The Battle for Michigan Avenue
Protestors were joined on 28 August by the Poor People's Campaign, now led by the Southern Christian Leadership Conference's Ralph Abernathy. This group had a permit and was split off from other demonstrators before being allowed to proceed to the amphitheater.  

"The Battle of Michigan Avenue", described by Neil Steinberg of The Chicago Sun-Times as "a 17-minute melee in front of the Conrad Hilton", was broadcast on television, along with footage from the floor of the convention. The police violence extended to protesters, bystanders, reporters and photographers, while tear gas reached Hubert Humphrey in his hotel suite. Police pushed protesters through plate-glass windows, then pursued them inside and beat them as they sprawled on the broken glass. 100 protesters and 119 police officers were treated for injuries, and 600 protesters were arrested. Television cameras recorded the police brutality while demonstrators chanted "The whole world is watching". 

At the convention several delegates made statements against Mayor Daley and the CPD, like Senator Abraham Ribicoff who, speaking from the podium, denounced the use of "Gestapo tactics on the streets of Chicago" in his speech nominating George McGovern. The hard line taken by the City was also seen on the convention floor itself. In 1968, Terry Southern described the convention hall as "exactly like approaching a military installation; barbed-wire, checkpoints, the whole bit". Inside the convention, journalists such as Mike Wallace and Dan Rather were roughed up by security; both these events were broadcast live on television.

Humphrey won the presidential nomination that night.

August 29: Ain't Marchin' Any More

 Paul Cowan of The Village Voice reports that after a speech by Eugene McCarthy in Grant Park that afternoon, a march was joined by delegates and McCarthy supporters but was stopped at 18th Street and Michigan Avenue by the National Guard. Arrests were followed by tear gas and mace, while marchers chanted "The whole world is watching" and retreated to Grant Park. In the park, demonstrators sang "God Bless America",  "This Land Is My Land", and  "The Star Spangled Banner", and waved  "V" symbols above their heads, asking soldiers to join in. They never did. Phil Ochs sang  "I Ain’t Marchin’ Any More", and demonstrators chanted "join us" softly. Five hours later, police officers raided a party organized by McCarthy workers in the Hilton hotel, and beat them viciously. According to the McCarthy workers, all telephones on their floor had been disconnected a half hour before, and they had no way to call for help.

Investigations

The city of Chicago, the  U.S. Department of Justice, the  House Committee on Un-American Activities, and the presidentially appointed  National Commission on the Causes and Prevention of Violence all responded with investigations of the violence. Within days, the Daley administration issued the first report, blaming the violence on "outside agitators", described as "revolutionaries" who came to Chicago "for the avowed purpose of a hostile confrontation with law enforcement". The Department of Justice report, however, found no grounds for prosecution of demonstrators, and Attorney General Ramsey Clark asked the U.S. attorney in Chicago to investigate possible civil rights violations by Chicago police. 

In Mayor Daley's report, a list of 152 officers wounded in Wednesday's melee was presented. Their wounds ranged from an officer's split fingernail to an officer's infra-orbital fracture of the left eye. Although the precise number of injured protesters is unknown, Dr. Quentin Young of the Medical Committee for Human Rights (MCHR) stated that most of the approximately 500 people treated in the streets suffered from minor injuries and the effects of tear gas. During the entirety of convention week, 101 civilians were treated for undisclosed injuries, by area hospitals, 45 of those on Wednesday night.

On September 4, 1968,  Milton Eisenhower, chair of the  National Commission on the Causes and Prevention of Violence, announced that the commission would investigate the violence at the Chicago convention and report its findings to President Lyndon Johnson. A Chicago lawyer,  Daniel Walker, headed the team of over 200 members, who interviewed more than 1,400 witnesses and studied FBI reports and film of the confrontations. The report was released on December 1, 1968, characterized the convention violence as a "police riot" and recommended prosecution of police who used indiscriminate violence; the report made clear that the vast majority of police had behaved responsibly, but also said that a failure to prosecute would further damage public confidence in law enforcement. The commission’s Walker Report, named after its chair Daniel Walker, acknowledged that demonstrators had provoked the police and responded with violence of their own, but found that the "vast majority of the demonstrators were intent on expressing by peaceful means their dissent".

Gallery

See also
 "The whole world is watching"
 Medium Cool, a 1969 fictional movie using real footage of the Chicago Convention demonstrations as backdrop
 Protests of 1968
 List of incidents of civil unrest in the United States
 Songs of Innocence and Experience, a 1970 album recorded by Allen Ginsberg, inspired in part by his witness of the protest
 Chicago Seven

References

Further reading
 Miami and the Siege of Chicago: An Informal History of the Republican and Democratic Conventions of 1968. Norman Mailer, New York: New American Library, 1968.

External links

An excerpt from Chicago '68 by David Farber.
An excerpt from No One Was Killed: The Democratic National Convention, August 1968 by John Schultz.
An excerpt from Battleground Chicago: The Police and the 1968 Democratic National Convention by Frank Kusch.
Art and Social Issues Offers a description of Bernard Perlin's Mayor Daley which depicts protests during the 1968 Democratic National Convention.
 August 27, 1968 recording of speeches and interviews broadcast by Bob Fass on WBAI, now hosted at the Internet Archive

1968 Democratic National Convention
1968 Democratic Party (United States) presidential campaigns
1968 United States presidential election
1968 in Illinois
1968 protests
Democratic National Conventions
20th century in Chicago
Articles containing video clips
August 1968 events in the United States
Chicago Police Department
Political riots in the United States
Protest marches in Chicago
Protests against results of elections
Protests against the Vietnam War
Richard J. Daley
Riots and civil disorder in Chicago
Yippies